Sameh Derbali is a Tunisian retired professional football player who played as a right back for Espérance de Tunis, Olympique Béja and Al Ahli Tripoli. He has made 11 appearances for the Tunisia national football team.

References

Living people
1986 births
Tunisian footballers
Tunisian expatriate footballers
Tunisia international footballers
Association football defenders
Tunisian Ligue Professionnelle 1 players
Espérance Sportive de Tunis players
Olympique Béja players
Expatriate footballers in Libya
Tunisian expatriate sportspeople in Libya
People from Sidi Bouzid Governorate